John Taft (born April 4, 1968) is an American former professional basketball player. Taft play his college basketball career at Marshall University where he was All-Southern Conference and twice was the Southern Conference Men's Basketball Player of the Year. After his career at Marshall, Taft went overseas to play professional basketball in Iceland, Cyprus, Philippines, and Israel. In Israel, Taft played for Ironi Ashkelon.

Professional career
In December 1992, Taft signed with Valur of the Icelandic Úrvalsdeild karla. In his debut with Valur, he scored 45 points in a narrow loss against Snæfell in the Icelandic Cup. In February 1993, he was selected to the Icelandic All-Star game where he scored 32 points. For the season, he averaged 26.2 points, 8.5 rebounds and 5.0 assists in 12 league games.

References

1968 births
Living people
American expatriate basketball people in Cyprus
American expatriate basketball people in Iceland
American expatriate basketball people in Israel
American expatriate basketball people in the Philippines
American men's basketball players
Basketball players from Alabama
Guards (basketball)
Ironi Ashkelon players
Marshall Thundering Herd men's basketball players
Philippine Basketball Association imports
San Miguel Beermen players
Sportspeople from Huntsville, Alabama
Úrvalsdeild karla (basketball) players
Valur men's basketball players